The House of Polignac is the name of an ancient and powerful French noble family that took its name from the château de Polignac, of which they had been sieurs since Carolingian times. Agnatically, ruling family of Monaco represents the collateral branch of the House of Polignac.

History 
In 1385, the male line became extinct, but the heiress married Guillaume, sire de Chalancon, who assumed the name and the coat of arms of Polignac family. Jules de Polignac (1746–1817) became the first Duke of Polignac in 1780.

Notable family members
 Melchior de Polignac (1661–1742), French diplomat, Roman Catholic cardinal and neo-Latin poet
 Jules de Polignac (1746–1817), became the first Duke of Polignac
 Gabrielle de Polastron, duchesse de Polignac (1749–1793), wife of the first Duke of Polignac
 Jules, prince de Polignac (1780–1847), promulgator of the July Ordinances
 Alphonse de Polignac (1826–1863), French mathematician and number theorist
 Camille Armand Jules Marie, prince de Polignac (1832–1913), Confederate general at the Battle of Sabine Crossroads
 Prince Edmond de Polignac (1834–1901), composer
 Winnaretta Singer, princess de Polignac (1865–1943)
 Pierre de Polignac (1895–1964), father of Rainier III, Prince of Monaco

External links

 
French noble families